Adele Faber (born January 12, 1928) is an American author. She writes books about parenting and families and is an expert on communication between adults and children. She currently resides in Long Island, New York and is the parent of three children.

Biography 
Faber graduated from the Queens College with a B.A. in theater and drama and earned her master's degree in education from New York University. She also taught in the New York City High schools for eight years. Having studied with the late child psychologist, Dr. Haim Ginott, Faber is also a former member of the faculty of The New School for Social Research in New York and The Family Life Institute of Long Island University.

Bibliography 
Books that Adele Faber has authored/co-authored, many of them intended for parents struggling to take care of their children, include:
 How to Talk So Kids Will Listen & Listen So Kids Will Talk
 Siblings Without Rivalry: How to Help Your Children Live Together So You Can Live Too
 How To Talk So Kids Can Learn
 How to Talk So Teens Will Listen and Listen So Teens Will Talk 
 Liberated Parents, Liberated Children: Your Guide to a Happier Family 
 How To Be The Parent You Always Wanted To Be 
 Hercules: The Man, The Myth, The Hero 
 In common cause 
 Between Brothers and Sisters 
 How to Talk So Kids Will Listen Book Summary 
 Bobby and the Brockles Go to School 
 Bobby and the Brockles 
 How To Stop Your Children Fighting

See also 
 Haim Ginott
 Elaine Mazlish

References

External links 
 LONG ISLAND Q&A: ADELE FABER AND ELAINE MAZLISH;2 Writers Guide Parents in Communicating With Children
 Adele Faber as featured on Harper Collins Publishers

1928 births
Living people
Writers from New York City
Queens College, City University of New York alumni
New York University alumni